Events from the year 1600 in Ireland.

Incumbent
Monarch: Elizabeth I

Events
January – Nine Years' War against England is renewed by Hugh O'Neill, 2nd Earl of Tyrone, with an invasion of Munster.
January 27 – Colonel Richard Wingfield is made Marshal of Ireland by Queen Elizabeth.
February 18 – Nine Years' War: Rebel cavalry in Munster led by Hugh Maguire (Lord of Fermanagh) are intercepted and their leaders killed.
May 15 – Nine Years' War: Chief Niall Garbh Ó Domhnaill betrays the Irish alliance and allows Henry Docwra to land at Lough Foyle with an expeditionary force of 4,000 men. In a devastating blow to the rebels, Docwra sets up a series of fortifications along the River Foyle, cutting access between Tír Eoghain and Tyrconnell.
September 20 – October 9: the Battle of Moyry Pass is fought. Lord Mountjoy's English forces eventually break through Hugh O'Neill's defences in County Armagh and establish a short-lived garrison at Mountnorris but later retreat.

Births
 Aedh O'Rourke, son of Tadhg O'Rourke of West Breifne and Mary O'Donnell of Tyrconnell.
Heber MacMahon, Roman Catholic Bishop of Clogher (d. 1650)
Terence Albert O'Brien, Roman Catholic Bishop of Emly, (d. 1651)
John Temple, judge and politician (d. 1677)
Approximate date
John Colgan, hagiographer and historian (d. c.1657)
James Dillon, Confederate officer (d. after 1669)
Piaras Feiritéar, poet and harpist (d. 1653)
Rory O'Moore, landowner, noble and rebel leader (d. 1655)

Deaths
February 18 – Hugh Maguire, Lord of Fermanagh and prominent rebel leader, is killed in Munster.
Baothghalach Mór Mac Aodhagáin, poet (b. 1550)

References

 
1600s in Ireland